Zhou Ping (18 February 1968) is a former female Chinese gymnast.

Zhou was born in Dalian. She was admitted to the Chinese national gymnastic team in 1982. Zhou competed at 1984 Olympic Games, and won a bronze medal in Women's Team competition. She retired in 1985, and later studied at Shenyang Sports College. Zhou is currently a coach in Dalian Amateur Sports School.

References

Chinese female artistic gymnasts
Olympic gymnasts of China
Gymnasts at the 1984 Summer Olympics
Olympic bronze medalists for China
Living people
1968 births
Olympic medalists in gymnastics
Sportspeople from Dalian
Gymnasts from Liaoning
Medalists at the 1984 Summer Olympics
20th-century Chinese women